The flag of Herm is white with a red St George's Cross with a banner of the arms of Herm in the canton; the arms are azure, between two dolphins argent a bend or bearing three cowled Benedictine monks sable. The ratio is 3:5. The flag was designed by the British vexillologist William Crampton. The arms of Herm was adopted in 1953. Around 1951 the island used a blue flag with the coat of arms of Guernsey near the hoist.

See also 
List of flags of the United Kingdom
Symbols of Normandy
Flag of Guernsey

References

Flag
National symbols of Guernsey
National flags
Flags introduced in 1953
1953 establishments in the United Kingdom

de:Flagge Guernseys#Flaggen der Inseln